Frank Moore (born 24 May 1952) is an Irish rower. He competed in the men's coxed pair event at the 1988 Summer Olympics.

References

External links
 

1952 births
Living people
Irish male rowers
Olympic rowers of Ireland
Rowers at the 1988 Summer Olympics